Francis Loveday (14 September 1892 – 18 October 1954) was an English cricketer. He played for Essex between 1921 and 1923.

References

External links

1892 births
1954 deaths
English cricketers
Essex cricketers
People from Hackney Central
Cricketers from Greater London
Cambridgeshire cricketers